Charles Harold Bartlett (23 September 1921 – 19 December 2014) was a British artist and printmaker.

References

1921 births
2014 deaths
20th-century British painters
British male painters
21st-century British painters
20th-century British printmakers
20th-century British male artists
21st-century British male artists